is a male Japanese voice actor. He is from Yamanashi, Japan. Soichiro is famous for his role in Sonic X as Sam Speed. He is part of the voice-acting company Office Osawa.

Notable voice roles
100% Pascal-sensei (Narration)
Cyborg 009 (young Dr. Gamo Whisky)
Daphne in the Brilliant Blue (Shibasaki Run)
Devil Lady (Tawada)
Glass Fleet: La légende du vent de l'univers (John Fall)
Heat Guy J (Gena)
Musashi Gundoh (Priest Takuan)
Panyo Panyo Di Gi Charat (Uncle)
Rave Master (Belial, La Grace, Tanchimo)
Rockman EXE (Shuuseki Ijuin, CosmoMan, FreezeMan)
Saiyuki (Ryokusho)
Samurai Deeper Kyo (Haira)
Sonic X (Sam Speed)
2 Stupid Dogs (Japanese dub) (Big Dog)

Tokusatsu
Chouseishin Gransazer (ep. 1 Narration)
Tokusou Sentai Dekaranger (Karakazlian Sanoa (ep. 32 - 33))

External links
  
 

1964 births
Living people
Male voice actors from Yamanashi Prefecture
Japanese male voice actors